Ronaldo Pereira Alves (born 16 November 1977), commonly known as Ronaldo, is a former Brazilian footballer.

Career statistics

Club

Notes

References

1977 births
Living people
Brazilian footballers
Association football defenders
Campeonato Brasileiro Série A players
Sport Club Internacional players
Criciúma Esporte Clube players
Associação Chapecoense de Futebol players
Veranópolis Esporte Clube Recreativo e Cultural players
Uberaba Sport Club players
Esporte Clube Cruzeiro players
Associação Atlética Iguaçu players
Ypiranga Futebol Clube players